Newbury Academy was an alternative private high school serving students in grades 9-12 that opened in September 2001, based in Dumont, New Jersey. From 2008–2009, Newbury Academy was a virtual school. All classes were conducted online, with teachers making weekly visits to the students' homes.

History and profile
The school was created to provide a safe, attentive environment for students who experience difficulties in traditional school settings. It was founded in 2001 by faculty member Jane E. McKinley, daughter of Graham C. Newbury and Jane Cunningham Newbury, for whom the school was named. From 2001–2003, the school was located in Teaneck, New Jersey, and moved to Dumont for the start of the 2003 academic year. Classes at Newbury Academy were based on New Jersey state core curriculum, and limited to a maximum class size of three. The school catered to individual student needs. All students were accepted, including those with neurological disorders, school phobia, attention deficit disorder, mild autism, or various learning disabilities. The education at Newbury Academy included regular excursions to historical sites and other local areas of interest. Classes were held at 344 Washington Avenue in Dumont until the end of the 2007–2008 academic year. From September 2008-June 2009, all classes were conducted online.

Faculty
The teachers at Newbury Academy were experienced, trained teachers, and met all requirements to teach their courses in the state of New Jersey. Full-time teachers included:
 Mrs. Dori Williams had been teaching in New Jersey since 1995 in a number of different capacities. She was serving as the director of the school and handles all administrative procedures. She taught Physics, Health and Digital Media and facilitated the Spanish and Japanese independent studies.
 Mrs. McKinley started teaching in 1965 and has since helped nurture the education of thousands of students, especially those with learning disabilities. She taught English and French.
 Mr. McKinley received national honors during his time at Newbury Academy, having scored in the highest 15% of all-time for examinees of the Praxis test for secondary social studies teachers. He taught US History and Algebra.
Part-time teachers:
 Ms. Carter (music) is a critically acclaimed musician who has played in Carnegie Hall. She taught piano and flute and offered voice lessons.
 Ms. Gribbon (art) is a textile artist who has been commissioned for numerous murals and has had work displayed in several galleries.

Additional information
 The first graduating class was in 2005. Of the graduates, two went on to study at Rutgers University (later completing higher degrees in business law, and the other in psychology), one completed his assistant pharmacist certification and went on to have his PhD funded by a local pharmacy, and another became a teaching assistant at Newbury Academy.
 In May 2006, Newbury Academy accepted its first student granted with out-of-district placement. Tuition was paid by the sending school district.
 Newbury Academy officially closed in 2009 with the retirement of faculty members, Mr. and Mrs. McKinley.

References

External links
Newbury Academy
families.com
Data for Newbury Academy, National Center for Education Statistics

2001 establishments in New Jersey
Dumont, New Jersey
Educational institutions established in 2001
Private high schools in Bergen County, New Jersey